The J. B. Bouche House is located in Brussels, Wisconsin. It was added to the State and the National Register of Historic Places in 2004.

References

Houses on the National Register of Historic Places in Wisconsin
National Register of Historic Places in Door County, Wisconsin
Houses in Door County, Wisconsin
Late 19th and Early 20th Century American Movements architecture
Brick buildings and structures